Peter Piel (12 August 1835 – 21 August 1904) was a German pioneer in the movement for reform of church music.

References

External links 
 

1835 births
1904 deaths
19th-century German musicians
19th-century German male musicians